Max Heß (born 13 July 1996) is a German track and field athlete who competes in the triple jump. He competed at the 2016 Summer Olympics and is the 2016 European Champion.

Career
Born in 1996, Heß won a silver medal at the 2014 World Junior Championships. He won another silver medal at the 2016 World Indoor Championships. He won gold at the 2016 European Championships. In 2017, he competed in the European Indoor Championships and the European U23 Championships, winning bronze in both. At the former, he set a personal best and German record of 17.52 m.

Competition record

Personal bests
Outdoor
Long jump – 7.57 (+0.5 m/s, Weinheim 2015)
Triple jump – 17.20 (Amsterdam 2016)
Indoor
Long jump – 8.03 (Chemnitz 2015)
Triple jump – 17.52 NR (Belgrade 2017)

References

External links
 
 
 
 
 
 

1996 births
Living people
Sportspeople from Chemnitz
German male triple jumpers
Olympic male triple jumpers
Olympic athletes of Germany
Athletes (track and field) at the 2016 Summer Olympics
Athletes (track and field) at the 2020 Summer Olympics
World Athletics Championships athletes for Germany
European Athletics Championships winners
European Athletics Championships medalists
German national athletics champions
European Athletics Rising Star of the Year winners